Matthieu Ladagnous (born 12 December 1984) is a French road and track racing cyclist, who currently rides for UCI WorldTeam .

Career
Born in Pau, Ladagnous became junior world champion at the madison in Melbourne, Australia in 2002 with his partner Tom Thiblier. In 2003 he won the French national title at the points race for the under-23 level. He also won a bronze medal at the individual sprint (under-23) and a silver medal at the madison with Fabien Patanchon in the elite class. Later that year he and Patanchon became European champions at the under-23 track cycling championships. A year later he won the bronze medal at the scratch in the 2003 under-23 championships. He improved his bronze national individual pursuit manager into a gold, while his points race gold was changed in a silver in 2004. In the elite class he won the madison gold, again alongside Patanchon.

In 2005 he first continued as a track cyclist and added another national under-23 silver to his palmarès at the individual pursuit. A silver medal in the elite class was added at the madison where he teamed up with Patanchon again. At the team pursuit he, Anthony Langella, Fabien Sanchez and Mickaël Mallie won the gold medal and became national elite champions. At the 2005 European championships in Fiorenzuola d'Arda he won a silver medal at the points race. In 2005 he also made his first road cycling appearance. He immediately won the prologue in the Mainfranken-Tour (under-23) and the overall classification. He decided to focus mainly at the road for the 2006 season, but won another team pursuit gold with Mickaël Delage, Jonathan Mouchel, Mikaël Preau and Sylvain Blanquefort. He booked his first road race win in 2006, when he won the fifth stage of the Tour Méditerranéen. The following year he won the fifth stage and the general classification of the Four Days of Dunkirk.

He was named in the start list for the 2017 Giro d'Italia.

Personal life
He is the brother of French rugby union international Caroline Ladagnous.

Major results

Track

2002
 1st  Madison, UCI Junior Track Cycling World Championships
2003
 1st  Madison, UEC European Under-23 Track Championships
 National Track Championships
1st  Under-23 points race
2nd Madison
3rd Under-23 individual pursuit
2004
 National Track Championships
1st  Madison
1st  Under-23 individual pursuit
2nd Points race
 3rd  Scratch, UEC European Under-23 Track Championships
 3rd  Scratch, UCI Track World Cup Classics, Sydney
2005
 National Track Championships
1st  Team pursuit
2nd Madison
2nd Under-23 individual pursuit
 2nd  Points race, UEC European Under-23 Track Championships
 2nd UIV Cup, Rotterdam
2006
 1st  Team pursuit, National Track Championships

Road

2005
 1st  Overall Mainfranken-Tour Under-23
1st Prologue
 1st Overall Kreiz Breizh Elites
1st Stages 2a & 3
 5th Overall Tour du Loir-et-Cher
 9th Road race, Mediterranean Games
2006
 1st Stage 5 Tour Méditerranéen
 6th Grand Prix de Plumelec-Morbihan
 6th Tour de Vendée
 7th Le Samyn
2007
 1st  Overall Four Days of Dunkirk
1st  Young rider classification
1st Stage 5
 4th Overall Circuit de la Sarthe
1st  Young rider classification
2009
 1st  Overall La Tropicale Amissa Bongo Ondimbo
1st Stage 1
 1st Polynormande
 2nd Tour de Vendée
 4th Overall Tour du Haut Var
 4th Overall Tour de Wallonie
 7th Kuurne–Brussels–Kuurne
 9th Overall Étoile de Bessèges
 10th Overall Four Days of Dunkirk
 10th Grand Prix d'Ouverture La Marseillaise
2010
 2nd Overall Étoile de Bessèges
 2nd Cholet-Pays de Loire
 4th Tour du Doubs
2011
 1st Stage 1 Tour de Wallonie
 2nd Overall Tour du Limousin
1st Stages 3 & 4
 4th Tour du Doubs
 5th Overall Driedaagse van West-Vlaanderen
 7th Tro-Bro Léon
 8th Polynormande
2012
 5th Grand Prix de Plumelec-Morbihan
 6th Overall Driedaagse van West-Vlaanderen
 7th E3 Harelbeke
 8th Omloop Het Nieuwsblad
2013
 1st Boucles de l'Aulne
 1st Stage 3 Tour du Limousin
 5th Tour of Flanders
 6th Gent–Wevelgem
 6th Grand Prix de Plumelec-Morbihan
 8th Overall Driedaagse van West-Vlaanderen
 8th Gran Premio Nobili Rubinetterie
2014
 7th Tour de Vendée
2015
 4th Overall Tour du Haut Var
 5th Grand Prix de Plumelec-Morbihan
2016
 2nd Overall La Méditerranéenne
1st Stage 1 (TTT)
 4th Grand Prix de Plumelec-Morbihan
 6th Overall Tour de Picardie
 10th Omloop Het Nieuwsblad
2018
 7th Paris–Camembert
 8th La Roue Tourangelle
 8th Tour du Doubs
 8th Gran Premio Bruno Beghelli
2020
  Combativity award Stage 11 Tour de France
2022
 10th Tro-Bro Léon

Grand Tour general classification results timeline

References

External links

 
 
 
 
 
 
 
 

1984 births
Living people
French male cyclists
French track cyclists
Olympic cyclists of France
Cyclists at the 2004 Summer Olympics
Cyclists at the 2008 Summer Olympics
Sportspeople from Pau, Pyrénées-Atlantiques
Competitors at the 2005 Mediterranean Games
Mediterranean Games competitors for France
Cyclists from Nouvelle-Aquitaine